

References 

Science and technology in Morocco
Education in Morocco